The Highbury Studios were a British film studio located in Highbury, North London which operated from 1937 until 1956. The studios were constructed by the producer Maurice J. Wilson. During its early years, the studio was hired out to independent production companies.

Credits 
Mrs Pym of Scotland Yard

Highbury Productions
Following the Second World War, Highbury was acquired by the Rank Organisation which used it to make low-budget second features featuring the company's rising actors. The studio was run by the producer John Croydon, who had previously worked at Ealing. Its aim was to make 50 minute "curtain raisers" for Rank's features. John Croydon was head of production. It frequently used members of Rank's Company of Youth.

In December 1948 the studio operation was shut down as part of a series of cuts made throughout the Rank Organisation, which had suffered heavy financial losses.

Select credits
A Song for Tomorrow (1948) – directed by Terence Fisher
Trouble in the Air (1948)
Penny and the Pownall Case (1948) – with Diana Dors, Christopher Lee
Colonel Bogey (1948) – directed by Terence Fisher
To the Public Danger (1948) – directed by Fisher, with Dermot Walsh and Susan Shaw
Fly Away Peter (1948)
Love in Waiting (1948) – with David Tomlinson
A Piece of Cake (1948)
Badger's Green (1949)
Stop the Merry-Go-Round (1952)

Later use
Occasional films were still made there by other companies, and it became increasingly used as a television studio. It made a number of commercials.

Bibliography
 Macnab, Geoffrey. J. Arthur Rank and the British Film Industry. Routledge, 1994.
 Warren, Patricia. British Film Studios: An Illustrated History. Batsford, 2001.

References

External links
Highbury Productions at BFI
Highbury Productions at IMDb

British film studios
Buildings and structures in the London Borough of Islington
Highbury